Die Schneider Krankheit (Spanish: El Mal de Schneider; English: The Schneider Disease, alternately Schneider's Disease) is a 2008 Spanish short science fiction mockumentary film written, directed, and produced by Javier Chillon, with brief animated sequences by Alicia Manero. Chillon's first film was shot on black and white Super 8 film, with a Spanish-language voice-over dubbed over another German one. With credits and most other onscreen text in German, the short film gives the impression of being a West German educational documentary film of the 1950s or 1960s. Its subject is the effect of an extraterrestrial plague brought to Earth by a Soviet chimpanzee cosmonaut after its capsule crash landed near the border with East Germany in 1958. Financed entirely by Chillon himself, the short film was selected for more than 200 international film festivals and received more than 45 awards within the first two years of its release, including a Méliès d'Argent in 2010.

Plot
In 1958, recent history is presented in the form of a documentary about a crashed Soviet space capsule near the border with East Germany. Inside the capsule is a chimpanzee cosmonaut, taken and subjected to tests by West German scientists. Soon after the discovery, the same scientists and their assistants get sick. The sickness spreads, and within a month, the first of the infected begin to die.

A struggle to find a cure ensues, resulting in a hybrid creature referred to as a chimera, genetically engineered from a green sea turtle, medicinal leech, and ocellated lizard whose purpose is to perform a kind of bleeding on the sick, effecting a limited cleansing of the patient's systems. The treatment extends survival by about ten months, but everyone, even those so treated, must wear gas masks to avoid new infections, which is the present state of things at the end of the documentary, in which a nuclear family is shown at home, each of them wearing a mask and living a "normal life".

Cast

Inspiration, themes, and analysis
Javier Chillon's main inspiration was the "Hollywood look of the 50s and the educational films of that time, documentaries with an enormous propagandistic content". He was also inspired by the period's American newsreels and science fiction B movies, such as those by Roger Corman, and European classics such as Chris Marker's La Jetée (there is a flat shot done as an homage), and Fritz Lang's Metropolis.

Die Schneider Krankheit shares a number of themes with Javier Chillón's second short film, Decapoda Shock: monstrous creatures resulting from "spatial" mutations or genetic manipulation, primarily derived from the science fiction B movies of the 1950s, the "atomic age".

The mockumentary attempts to make its viewers "believe what they are watching" and to recreate a time period "without using any archival footage." Scholar  remarks that this kind of "retro-inflected material enjoys significant popularity" in twenty-first century science-fiction short films, citing Die Schneider Krankheit, Matthew Savage's Reign of Death (2009), and Johan Löfstedt's Kometen (The Comet, 2004).

Production

Writing and development
Chillon originally intended to set the film in France, but quickly realised that the story ought to take place in Germany, which has always been the country of "mad doctors" in popular culture, and moreover, the Cold War-era Partition provided an excellent context. There was a storyboard, but, as with a real documentary, there was no sequence development in terms of the movement of dramatic actors; a few sequences were invented on the fly during principal photography.

Financing
Chillon financed the two-and-a-half-year project himself for €9000, obtaining various elements for free or cheaply through his family connections or friends: for example, the film's art director, his cousin, together with another friend who is a theatre set designer, were able to get the hospital beds for free from rental companies in Madrid, and all the sets were mounted in the loft of a friend's house. Essentially, the budget paid for rolls of film, petrol, and food.

Casting and crew
The approximately fifty or so non-professional actors who appear in the film were friends, or friends of friends, or parents of friends, and his own father, Javier Chillon, Sr. Even so, they were carefully cast: mainly Spanish, they had to look like Germans of the 1950s, to move and act like the people from the old documentaries, just doing their work, often oblivious to the camera. Chillon obsessed over that aspect. The only professional actor in Die Schneider Krankheit is Paco Casares, the narrator. Chillon saw the stage actor in a play and said to himself, this is the voice; he was easy to direct, and the entirety of his spoken text was recorded in one afternoon.

Most of Chillon's small crew were made up of either members of his family or friends: his father (a painter and sculptor) worked alongside his mother in special effects; his cinematographer Luis Fuentes is a close friend, while make-up was done by a friend who is a professional make-up artist and hairdresser.

Design
It was important to Chillon to pay attention to the smallest details and create the right atmosphere; the individual elements (wardrobe, sets, actors, and so on) would only work when presented through the correct production values. For the most part the sets such as the tiled walls and floors, microscopes, hospital room, had to be constructed. Despite the aim at realism, it is still a science fiction film and could not be made without special effects, "however we tried not to use info graphics whenever it was possible."The criterion was clear: using the same techniques used by filmmakers of that time. Models, make-up effects, animations from pictures previously shot and superimposition  effects are some of the techniques that helped  to set Die  Schneider  Krankheit in a very specific style and period.

Filming
The film was shot in Madrid, in black and white Super 8, with a 4:3 aspect ratio, as much for budgetary as for aesthetic reasons. Chillon had worked with 16mm and Super 16 as a student at Solent University, Southampton, but they were too expensive; he and Fuentes began investigating Super 8, wondering why it was no longer used professionally, and discovered friends from Solent University had worked with it, and lent them a Sankyo 320XL camera, which they thought looked like a "toy" when they first saw it; Chillon said jokingly it is the worst camera in the world, but he and Fuentes would not change it once they saw what it could do.

Principal photography
Shooting began with the most "delicate" parts of the short film, those with the largest sets, neither director nor cinematographer knowing what the outcome would be, having done no tests, also recording in ProHD, in case everything "went to hell", to have a video back-up. Most sequences were shot on a tripod, but in an effort to simulate an older documentary, they also included a few hand-held shots, Fuentes using Tri-X or Plus-X film depending on the amount of light for each shot. They used high contrast film and film grain, which are distinctive of the genre, along with automatic exposure and deliberate "velatures" to reinforce the documentary style:The real challenge is to achieve the balance between the realism of longer shots with little editing and a more cinematic look: distinctive camera angles and hand-held camera shots. A delicate balance which will guide the audience during the journey through the threatened world of Die Schneider Krankheit.As most of the cast were not professional actors, they were not put off by the look of the Sankyo camera, until shooting began: it makes a lot of noise, and this led to some of the actors being surprised and not moving.

Animation
Most of the animation was done on poster prints in Super 8; the pan or tilt of the camera is real. The image of the human body is physical paper put on an easel and rolled. A 50 cm model of the landing space capsule was built by Chillon and his father out of porespan and cardboard, filmed and then integrated into the field.

Editing
The ten-minute film was edited down from sixty minutes of footage. The result is a film similar to the format of educational documentaries of the 1950s such as might be found in the Prelinger Archives.

Sound and music
Another element of realism in the film is the superimposing of the voices in German and Spanish, as Chillon explained: "Those documentaries had only one soundtrack, that's the reason why when they were dubbed, the original soundtrack had to be kept in and the translated narration had to be superimposed." Both voices are heard on the soundtrack, "with a distinctive classic tone from the 1950s sci-fi films with characteristic melodies and effects from that era."

Cirilo Fernández is an Argentinian who studied music at Berklee and met Chillon through some friends. Chillon asked him to produce a 1950s B movie orchestral soundtrack with a theremin, which he did in a week, "without real instruments".

Release
Die Schneider Krankheit had its premiere at the 41st Sitges Film Festival on 2 October 2008. There is typically no Super 8 category at film festivals, so it was usually screened among video entries rather than 35 or 16 mm. Within the first two years of its release, the short film was selected for more than 200 international film festivals and received more than forty-five awards. In 2016, there was a special screening of the short with Chillon's third short film, They Will All Die in Space at the Skepto International Film Festival.

Home media
Die Schneider Krankheit and the director's second film, Decapoda Shock, appear as bonus material on a Spanish-subtitled DVD of Daniel Cockburn's 2010 feature film, You Are Here.

Online platform
The film is available in its entirety on Vimeo.

Reception

Critical response

Critics were impressed by the realism of Die Schneider Krankheit, which "painstakingly recreates an alternate history through a seamlessly authentic aesthetic." The editors at Sin Final en el Guion suggest it is probably one of the best first films by any director. The realism achieved is of such a high degree that it was rejected by some early festivals because selectors believed archival footage had been used. As a result, disclaimers were placed at the beginning of the film to "let the viewer know that the images are original, and not extracted from real documentaries." The opening sequence and end credits, along with the dual Spanish-German soundtrack, appear to have been convincing enough to lead some viewers to believe the film is genuinely of German origin (and in one case, Russian).

Once the initial misunderstanding about archival footage had been cleared up, the short caught on very quickly, and received "raves on the festival circuit". Virginie Sélavie calls the short "inventive, intelligent", and "fantastic": the "50s newsreel style is perfectly reproduced, while the reasonable tone of the reporter is brilliantly contrasted with the outlandish events depicted." Christopher Webster calls the short a "perfect blend of newsreel, visual FX and creative storytelling".
 Artie Knapp was impressed right from the first shots, "with the camera tilting down through the trees to show us the crash site at long range ... a nearly prefect rendition of old documentary style right down to how the camera would move."This is science fiction that is a deadly accurate portrayal of the calm, governmental, ponderous yet urgent, carefully-framed and full-of-import quality found in mid-century documentary films.  The humor is sly and builds its effect gradually. It's also somewhat frightening.Reviewing the film at the Flatpack Festival, Alex King calls it a highlight of the event, but found it more than "somewhat frightening": "it captures perfectly the dark, clunky feel of old newsreels yet every single shot is created through original footage."The scene where an innocent 50s nuclear family sit around the television all wearing sinister WWII gas-masks while the narrator explains how "normal family life" has continued despite the epidemic is one of the most chilling things I have ever seen on film.The special effects were likewise good enough to give a French reviewer goosebumps, who also suggested the short could have made a good story segment on The Twilight Zone.  A reviewer on Ain't It Cool News called the film "without a doubt, one of the very oddest – and very best – bits of film that I've come across this year," advising: "Don't try to understand, just enjoy." A Canadian reviewer at the Fantasia International Film Festival expected that a short mockumentary "should be awful, but this 10 minute gem shot on 8mm Tri-X stock is brilliant."

Tim Hall, of the Seattle Post-Intelligencer, gives the short a grade of "C", finding it "somewhat enjoyable if "a little bizarre"; he "wasn't sure where they were going with this film".

Accolades
By the end of its run in October 2011, Die Schneider Krankheit had been screened at 255 festivals, and won at least fifty awards or special mentions.

2008
Awards
18th Fancine • Best Spanish Short Film
38th  (Alcalá de Henares) • Best Art Direction (Ángel Boyado and Nino Morante)
15th CineMad - Cine Independiente y de Culto (Madrid) • Best Sci-Fi Short Film
10th  (Soria) • Best Art Direction (€1000)
12th Muestra de Cine Independiente y Fantástico (Toledo) • Best Short Film
Special mention
8th Trieste Science+Fiction Festival

2009
Awards
15th Concurso de Cortos de Leioa Bizkaia (Leioa) • Second Best Short Film
6th VisualSound (Barcelona) • Best Short Film
21st U.S. Super 8 Film and Digital Video (Rutgers University) • Best Experimental Short Film
27th Uruguay International (Montevideo) • Best International Short Film
15th Trofeu Torretes "especial Mar" (Calella) • Best Short Amateur Argumentative/Fiction Film
3rd Mockfest (Hollywood) • Zelig Award (for Innovation in Mockumentary Filmmaking)
10th Torrelavega (Torrelavega) • Best Short Film - Video Section
5th Trayecto Corto (Velilla de San Antonio) • Best Art Direction
7th Caostica, (Bilbao) • Best Short Film - Video Section
13th Primavera Cinematográfica de Lorca (Murcia) • Second Best Short Film
5th Portello River (Padua) • Best Short Film
4th  (Sax, Alicante) • Best Documentary Short Film
5th Cine Paradiso (Barrax) • Best Short Film
14th Certamen de Creación Audiovisual (Cabra) • Best Short Film (€2700)
2nd FicBueu (Bueu) • Best Art Direction (Ángel Boyano & Nino Morante) • Best Make-Up and Hairdressing (Isabel Avernheimer & Mayte González) • Best Costume Design (Ariadna Paniagua)
3rd Octubre de Por Barcelona Horror • Best Short Film
15th  (Paris) • Best Short Film
10th Buenos Aires Rojo Sangre • Best Short Film
6th Certamen de Documental e Vídeo Secuenciacero •  Best Short Film
1st Pasado y Futuro (Almendralejo) • Second Best Short Film
10th  (Sonorama) • Jury Prize, Best Short Film
3rd CryptShow (Barcelona - Art Direction)
Special mentions
3rd Cambridge International Super 8 Festival (Cambridge)
5th Cortomenar Festival Nacional de Cortometrajes (Colmenar Viejo) Jury

2010
Awards
Méliès d'Argent, presented at the 20th Espoo Ciné International
3rd Escorto Festival (El Escorial) • Best Art Direction • Best Editing • Best Soundtrack • Best Make-Up and Hairdressing • Best Costume Design
4th Short Shorts (Mexico City) • Best Cinematography
10th Certamen de Creación Joven Valencia Crea (Valencia) • Best Spanish Short Film
10th Vídeo Jove (Alella) • (Professionals) Fourth Best Short Film
6th  (Tapiales) • Best Foreign Short Film
3rd Festerror (Cine de Terror y Fantástico, Lloret de Mar) • Best Short Film
8th FIKE - Évora International (Évora) • Organization Award
12th FEC (European Short), National Competition (Cambrils) • Second Best Short Film
7th MIDEC (Universidad de La Laguna) • Best Cinematography
10th Festival de Cine de Lanzarote (Lanzarote) • Best Spanish Short Film
Special mentions
6th  (Lago, Calabria - Sui Generis Section)
8th International Super 8mm Festival (Szeged)

2011
Award
1st Bio-Fiction Science Art (Vienna) • Special Award of the Jury

References

External links
Official online release on Vimeo
Official trailer on YouTube
Die Schneider Krankheit on IMDb

2000s Spanish-language films
2000s German-language films
2008 films
2008 animated films
2008 short films
2008 horror films
2000s animated short films
2000s science fiction horror films
Films set in 1958
Films set in Germany
Spanish black-and-white films
Spanish short films
Spanish science fiction drama films
Spanish science fiction horror films
2000s psychological drama films
2000s mockumentary films
Films about infectious diseases
Films about space programs
Films with live action and animation
Alternate history films
2008 drama films